Face First may refer to:

 Face First (Tribal Tech album)
 Face First (Masque album)